McKenzie Creek is a stream in Vernon County in the U.S. state of Missouri. It is a tributary of Osage River.

McKenzie Creek, historically called "McKenzie's Branch" has the name of Nelson G. McKenzie, an early settler.

See also
List of rivers of Missouri

References

Rivers of Vernon County, Missouri
Rivers of Missouri